Max Waldman (1919-1981) was a dance and theater photographer who was also well known for his dramatic shots on a great range of subjects from football players to immigrants. The photographer became best known for his portraits of such celebrated ballet dancers as Mikhail Baryshnikov and Natalia Makarova through his books, including "Waldman on Theater" and "Waldman on Dance." Contemporary photographers such as Daniel Nicoletta, was influenced by Waldman. His photographs were exhibited in numerous group and one man shows in a wide variety of venues, including; the New York Public Library, the La Jolla Museum of Art, and the Rose Museum of Brandeis University. His work is also found as part of many private and public collections, such as  the Metropolitan Museum of Modern Art in New York, and the George Eastman House.

References 

Photographers from New York (state)
American portrait photographers
20th-century American photographers
1919 births
1981 deaths
American people of Jewish descent